George "Shorty" Redding (March 6, 1900 in — October 17, 1974) was a Canadian professional ice hockey left wing. He played 33 games for the Boston Bruins of the National Hockey League over two seasons, 1924–25 and 1925–26. The rest of his career, which lasted from 1921 to 1932, was spent in different minor leagues.

Playing career
Redding once filled in as the Bruins goaltender when regular netminder Hec Fowler was injured during a game against the Toronto St. Pats. He would allow 1 goal in 10 minutes of play to give him a career GAA of 5.45. Redding would play 33 career NHL games at his regular left wing position.

Career statistics

Regular season and playoffs

References

External links
 

1900 births
1974 deaths
Boston Bruins players
Boston Tigers (CAHL) players
Buffalo Majors players
Canadian ice hockey left wingers
Ice hockey people from Ontario
London Panthers players
Minneapolis Millers (AHA) players
Ontario Hockey Association Senior A League (1890–1979) players
Sportspeople from Peterborough, Ontario